Navaratnasingam Ratnavarothiam Rajavarothiam (8 October 1908 – 27 August 1963; commonly known as N. R. Rajavarothiam) was a Ceylon Tamil politician and Member of Parliament.

Early life
Rajavarothiam was the son of Navaratnasingam, from Trincomalee in eastern British Ceylon. He was educated at St. Joseph's College, Trincomalee and Ananda College, Colombo. He later entered Ceylon University College. He was chief trustee of Muttucumarswamy Temple.

Rajavarothiam married to Sivayohanayaki and had two sons.

Political career
Rajavarothiam joined the Illankai Tamil Arasu Kachchi (Federal Party) and became an active member of the party. He became vice president of the party. He was ITAK's candidate for Trincomalee at the 1952 parliamentary election. He won the election and entered Parliament, where he was one of only two ITAK MPs. He was re-elected at the 1956, March 1960 and July 1960 parliamentary elections.

References
 

1908 births
1963 deaths
Alumni of Ananda College
Alumni of the Ceylon University College
Illankai Tamil Arasu Kachchi politicians
Members of the 2nd Parliament of Ceylon
Members of the 3rd Parliament of Ceylon
Members of the 4th Parliament of Ceylon
Members of the 5th Parliament of Ceylon
Sri Lankan Tamil politicians